Frank Trenholm Coffyn (October 24, 1878 – December 10, 1960) was a pioneer aviator.

Biography 
He was born in Charleston, South Carolina on October 24, 1878 to Julia (Haskell) and George M. Coffyn, a banker. His brother was William Henry Coffin, an artist who took his own life in 1941.

He married Louise D. Adams in 1902 and had two children: Nancy Lou Coffyn Stralem (1902-1995) and Kingsland A. Coffyn (1904–1983). After they divorced, he married Pauline Louise Neff in 1919. They divorced in 1928.

He became interested in flight after witnessing a flight by Louis Paulhan in New York City in December 1909. His father knew one of the Wright Company's executives, and arranged a meeting with Wilbur Wright. Wilbur invited Coffyn to Dayton, Ohio where he began flight instruction in May 1910.

Coffyn flew with the Wright Exhibition Team until December 1910 where he trained pilots in Dayton, Ohio and he delivered aircraft to the United States Army in Texas. In 1912 he was hired by Russell A. Alger Jr. (1873–1930) of Detroit, Michigan to fly a Wright Flyer Model B over New York City.

The Vitagraph Film Company had him shoot the first aerial footage of New York City where he flew under the Brooklyn Bridge and Williamsburg Bridge in his Mayea Boat & Aeroplane Works plane.

In the mid-1920s Coffyn appeared in several Hollywood silent movies.

He was a United States Army flight instructor in World War I. He sold aircraft for the Burgess Company, and  got a helicopter pilot's license. He worked for the Hiller helicopter company until his retirement.

He died on December 10, 1960 in Palo Alto, California.

Selected filmography
 Her Husband's Secret (1925)
 Private Affairs (1925)
 Ranson's Folly (1926)

External list
Frank Trenholm Coffyn at Flickr Commons via Library of Congress

References 

Members of the Early Birds of Aviation
People from Dayton, Ohio
Wright brothers
1878 births
1960 deaths